The Ali Gholi Agha Mosque is a mosque in Isfahan, Iran, built by Ali Gholi Agha, who also built the Ali Gholi Agha hammam.

Sources 

Mosques in Isfahan Province
Mosque buildings with domes
National works of Iran